Count Ivan Matveyevich Tolstoy was a Russian nobleman, diplomat, senator, grand master of court ceremonies, and minister of postal service.

Biography 
Count I. M. Tolstoy worked in the Ministry of Foreign Affairs until 1860. For a brief interval, he served as Chief Steward of the Imperial Household and was grand master of court ceremonies. In 1863, he became Feodor Pryanishnikov's immediate successor as Head of the Postal Department.

In 1865, he was appointed to the first Minister of Posts and Telegraphs. An attempt to merge the postal and telegraph services was not successful. Only in 1884, during the reign of Alexander III, were the two services amalgamated. This resulted in the depiction of thunderbolts and post horns on Russian postage stamps.

Tolstoy died in 1867. He was replaced by General  (1818–1893) as the Minister of Posts and Telegraphs.

See also 
 Feodor Pryanishnikov
 Postage stamps and postal history of Russia
 Samuel Polyakov
 Tolstoy (family)

References 

1806 births
1867 deaths
Ivan Matveyevich
Counts of the Russian Empire
Government ministers of Russia
Diplomats of the Russian Empire
Senators of the Russian Empire
Russian postmasters